The French 1st Light Cavalry Division (1er Division de Cavalerie Légère) was a French Army division active during World War II. The 1st Light Cavalry Division was formed alongside the 2nd, 3rd, 4th, and 5th Light Cavalry Divisions in February 1940.

World War 2

Battle Of France
During the Battle of France in May 1940 the division contained the following units:

Chief of Staff, 1st Light Division
Components:
11th Light Mechanized Infantry Brigade (11e Brigade d'Infanterie Mécanisé)
1st Armoured Car Regiment (1er Régiment de Véhicules Blindés)
5th Mechanized Dragoon Regiment (5e Régiment de Mécanisé Dragons)
2nd Cavalry Brigade (2e Brigade de Cavalerie)
1st Cavalry Regiment (1er Régiment de Chasseurs à Cheval)
19th Dragoon Regiment (19e Régiment de Dragons)
75th Divisionary Light Cavalry Artillery Regiment (75e Régiment d’Artillerie de Division Légère de Cavalerie)

In 1940 during the occupation of France the division was disbanded.

References

1
Cavalry divisions of France